An egg is an organic vessel in which an embryo begins to develop.

Egg or eggs may also refer to:

Biology
 Egg cell, the female reproductive cell (gamete) in oogamous organisms

Food
 Egg as food

Places
 Egg, Austria
 Egg, Switzerland

People
 Augustus Egg (1816–1863), English artist
 Mr Egg (born 1959), Scottish musician, born James Matthew McDonald
 Oscar Egg (1890–1961), Swiss racing cyclist

Arts, entertainment, and media

Fictional entities
 Egg, the name of the inhabited neutron star in the book Dragon's Egg by Robert L. Forward
 Aegon V Targaryen, nicknamed "Egg", a titular character from the Tales of Dunk and Egg stories by George R. R. Martin
 Ann Veal, also known as Egg, a character on the show Arrested Development

Films
 Egg (2007 film), a 2007 Turkish-Greek drama
 Egg (2018 film), a 2018 American comedy film
 Eggs (film) a 1995 Norwegian comedy

Games
 Egg (video game), a 1981 video game made by Nintendo
 Elemental Gimmick Gear or EGG, a 1999 Sega Dreamcast game

Music

Groups
 Egg (band), English group founded 1969
 Eggs (band), an American group founded 1990
 The Egg (band), a British electronic dance music band

Albums
 Egg (album), an album by Egg

Television
 The Eggs, an Australian-Canadian animated series
EGG, the Arts Show, a TV program
 eGG HD, a TV channel by Astro Malaysia, focusing on e-sports

Other arts, entertainment, and media
 Egg (magazine), a Japanese style magazine published since 1995 
 Eggs (novel), a novel by Jerry Spinelli, published in 2007
 "The Egg" (de Camp short story), a short story by L. Sprague de Camp published in 1956
 "The Egg" (Weir short story) a short story by Andy Weir published in 2009

Brands and enterprises
 Egg (car), a Swiss car make in business from 1896 to 1919
 Egg (chair), a chair designed by Arne Jacobsen in 1958 
 EG&G, an American defense contractor, founded in 1931 and defunct since 2009
 Egg Banking, a British internet bank established in 1996 
 Egg London, a famous nightclub in England
 L'Oeuf (the Egg), an aluminum and plexiglass car designed by Paul Arzens

Science and technology
 EGG (file format), a compressed archive file format used in computers
 Python eggs, a format used by the Python programming language
 Electrogastrogram, a graphic showing electrical signals in the stomach muscles
 Electroglottograph, a device for measuring vocal fold movement
 Evaporating gaseous globule, a type of interstellar gas cloud that is thought to give rise to new stars

Other uses

 Darning egg, a sewing tool
 EGG Project, or Global Consciousness Project, a parapsychology experiment begun in 1998 at Princeton University
 Erbgesundheitsgericht, the Genetic Health Court of Nazi Germany
 World egg or Cosmic egg, a mythological motif found in the creation myths of many cultures and civilizations
 Egging, the act of throwing eggs at people or property
 Egg, in LGBT slang a transgender person who has not yet realized that they are trans

See also
 
 
 Easter egg (disambiguation)
 Egg Island (disambiguation)
 Egge (disambiguation)
 Egged (disambiguation)
 Golden egg (disambiguation)
 The Egg (disambiguation)